Charles B. Tanksley (born April 7, 1952) is an American politician. He was a five-term member of the Georgia Senate, serving from 1995 to 2004 as a member of the United States Republican Party from the 32nd District in Cobb County, Georgia. He was elected to the Senate in a special election held in January, 1995.

Early life and education
Tanksley was born in Atlanta, Georgia. He graduated from the University of Virginia in 1974 and obtained his J.D. from the University of Georgia in 1978.

Career
During his time in the Senate, Tanksley was the Senate floor leader for Governor Roy E. Barnes from 1998 to 2002, who was a member of the United States Democratic Party and was Tankley’s former law partner. Tanksley also served as Chairman of the Senate Special Judiciary Committee from 1998 to 2002 and was chairman of the Energy Task Force.

After leaving the Senate in 2004, he joined the Atlanta office of Womble Carlyle Sandridge & Rice, PLLC where he practiced with the firm's Government Relations Practice Group. Tanksley has since left Womble Carlyle Sandridge & Rice, PLLC and now practices with the Barnes Law Group.

References

External links
Womble Carlyle Profile
Martindale-Hubbell Profile
July 6, 2004 Press Release

1952 births
Living people
Georgia (U.S. state) state senators
University of Georgia alumni
Georgia (U.S. state) lawyers